Vallatha Pahayan (Malayalam : വല്ലാത്ത  പഹയൻ) is a 2013 Indian Malayalam Drama movie, produced by Milan Jaleel and directed by Niyas Bakker. The film stars Manikandan Pattambi, Rachana Narayanankutty in the lead roles along with a supporting cast of Mamukkoya, Mala Aravindan, Kulappulli Leela, Kochu Preman, and K. P. A. C. Lalitha.

Cast 
Manikandan Pattambi as Balachandran
Rachana Narayanankutty as Balachandran's wife
Vinod Kovoor as Shukkur
Sneha Sreekumar as Suhara, Shukkur's wife
S. P. Sreekumar as Prahlathan
Janardhanan as Balan's father
K. P. A. C. Lalitha as Balan's mother
Mamukkoya as Seydhali
Mala Aravindan
Kulappulli Leela as Naniyamma
Kochu Preman as Nambiar, the school headmaster
Jaffar Idukki as Ashraf
Sasi Kalinga as Thankappan Shanghai
Sunil Sukhada as Porinju, the money lender
Kottayam Nazeer
Irshad
Roslin as Seydhali's wife 
Niyas Backer as Kuruvilla, the school teacher
Mani Shornur as Rameshan, the tea shop owner 
Salim Hassan

Music
"Daivame Nirayunnu"
"Daivame Nirayunnu" (Karaoke)
"Kannamthalir Poovu" (Duet)
"Kannamthalir Poovu" (F)
"Kannamthalir Poovu" (Karaoke)
"Kannamthalir Poovu" (M)
"Ramanamkili"
"Ramanamkili" (Karaoke)

References

2013 films
2010s Malayalam-language films